The men's sprint event at the 1980 Summer Olympics took place on 23–26 July 1980 in Krylatskoye Sports Complex Velodrome. There were 15 competitors from 15 nations, with three additional non-starters. The event was won by Lutz Heßlich of East Germany, the nation's first victory in the men's sprint. Yavé Cahard took silver, extending France's medal streak to five Games despite the retirement of Daniel Morelon (who had medaled in the past four). Sergei Kopylov of the host Soviet Union earned bronze.

Background
This was the 17th appearance of the event, which has been held at every Summer Olympics except 1904 and 1912. The only returning quarterfinalist from 1976 was champion Anton Tkáč of Czechoslovakia. France's Daniel Morelon, who had taken a medal in the last four Games, had retired in 1977. Lutz Heßlich of East Germany was the 1979 world champion and the favorite in Moscow.

Libya and Zimbabwe each made their debut in the men's sprint. France made its 17th appearance, the only nation to have competed at every appearance of the event.

Competition format
This sprint competition involved a series of head-to-head matches. The 1980 competition, despite an even smaller starting field than in 1976 (15 cyclists, down from 18), actually increased the number of rounds back to 10 (from eight in 1976). This format used six main rounds (first round, second round, 1/8 finals, quarterfinals, semifinals, and finals) and three repechages, including a two-round first repechage. Only one cyclist was eliminated after the first three rounds (round 1 and the two-round first repechage).

 Round 1: The 18 entrants were divided into 9 heats of 2 cyclists each; because of three withdrawals, three of the heats were walkovers. The winner of each heat advanced directly to round 2 (9 cyclists), while all other cyclists who competed were sent to the first repechage semifinals (6 cyclists).
 First repechage semifinals: The 6 cyclists were divided into 3 heats, each with 2 cyclists. The winner of each heat advanced to round 2 (3 cyclists), while the loser went to the first repechage final (3 cyclists).
 First repechage final: The 3 cyclists all competed together in the first repechage final; the top two advanced to round 2 while the last-placed cyclist was the first man eliminated from the competition.
 Round 2: The 14 cyclists were divided into 7 heats of 2 cyclists each. The winner of each heat advanced to the 1/8 finals (7 cyclists) while losers went to the second repechage (because of one withdrawal, there were only 6 cyclists that went to the repechage).
 Second repechage: The 6 cyclists competed in 3 heats of 2 cyclists. Winners advanced to the 1/8 finals, losers were eliminated.
 1/8 finals: The 10 cyclists who advanced through the first rounds (including repechage) competed in a 1/8 finals round. There were 5 heats in this round, with 2 cyclists in each. The top cyclist in each heat advanced to the quarterfinals (5 cyclists), while the loser in each heat went to the third repechage (5 cyclists).
 Third repechage: This repechage featured two heats, one of two cyclists and one of three cyclists. Only the last-placed man in each heat was eliminated; the winners advanced to the quarterfinals along with the second-place cyclist in the three-rider heat.
 Quarterfinals: Beginning with the quarterfinals, all matches were one-on-one competitions and were held in best-of-three format. There were 4 quarterfinals, with the winner of each advancing to the semifinals and the loser going to the fifth-eighth classification race.
 Semifinals: The two semifinals provided for advancement to the gold medal final for winners and to the bronze medal final for losers.
 Finals: Both a gold medal final and a bronze medal final were held, as well as a classification final for fifth through eighth places for quarterfinal losers.

Records
The records for the sprint are 200 metre flying time trial records, kept for the qualifying round in later Games as well as for the finish of races.

Sergei Kopylov recorded 10.55 seconds in the fourth heat of round 2, 10.56 seconds, in the first race of the bronze medal match, and 10.47 seconds in the second race of the bronze medal match.

Schedule
All times are Moscow Time (UTC+3)

Results

Round 1

Round 1 heat 1

Round 1 heat 2

Round 1 heat 3

Round 1 heat 4

Round 1 heat 5

Round 1 heat 6

Round 1 heat 7

Round 1 heat 8

Round 1 heat 9

First repechage semifinals

First repechage semifinal 1

First repechage semifinal 2

First repechage semifinal 3

First repechage final

Round 2

Round 2 heat 1

Round 2 heat 2

Round 2 heat 3

Round 2 heat 4

Round 2 heat 5

Round 2 heat 6

Round 2 heat 7

Second repechage

Second repechage heat 1

Second repechage heat 2

Second repechage heat 3

1/8 finals

1/8 final 1

1/8 final 2

1/8 final 3

1/8 final 4

1/8 final 5

Third repechage

Third repechage heat 1

Third repechage heat 2

Quarterfinals

Quarterfinal 1

Quarterfinal 2

Quarterfinal 3

Quarterfinal 4

Semifinals

Semifinal 1

Semifinal 2

Finals

Classification 5–8

Bronze medal match

Final

References

Track cycling at the 1980 Summer Olympics
Cycling at the Summer Olympics – Men's sprint